is a steel 4th Dimension Hypercoaster at Fuji-Q Highland in Fujiyoshida, Yamanashi, Japan. The ride was the world's second 4th Dimension coaster. Eejanaika is taller, faster, and longer than its predecessor, X2 at Six Flags Magic Mountain.

The roller coaster, designed by S&S Arrow, is a "4th Dimension" coaster, a design in which the seats can rotate forward or backward 360 degrees in a controlled spin.  This is achieved by having four rails on the track: two of these are running rails while the other two are for spin control. The two rails that control the spin of the seats move up and down relative to the track and spin the seats using a rack and pinion gear mechanism.

Eejanaika has the second "え" turned upside down for the roller coaster's official spelling. Eejanaika has several meanings, but is usually interpreted to mean "Ain't it great!" According to the Guinness Book of World Records, Eejanaika is the roller coaster with the most inversion with 14, although this is disputed because 11 of Eajanaika's inversions are inversions of the seat rather than inversions of the track.

Ride experience
The 3782 ft (1153 m) roller coaster features 14 inversions, 1 zero-g roll, a fly to lie, 2 raven turns, and a half camelback twist.

See also
 Alan Schilke, the inventor of the 4th Dimension roller coaster concept
 Ee ja nai ka

Notes

External links 

 Fuji-Q Eejanaika (official site)
 

Fuji-Q Highland
Roller coasters introduced in 2006
Roller coasters in Japan